Soyana is a rural locality (a village) and the administrative center of Soyanskoye Rural Settlement of Mezensky District, Arkhangelsk Oblast, Russia. The population was 309 as of 2010. There are 7 streets.

Geography 
Soyana is located 39 km west of Mezen (the district's administrative centre) by road.

References 

Rural localities in Mezensky District